29- or 31-Norcycloartenol, also called 4α,14α-dimethyl-9β,19-cyclo-5α-cholest-24-en-3β-ol, is a Metabolic intermediate of plant sterol biosynthesis. In the pathway, it is transformed from demethylation of cycloartenol, then 9,19-cyclopropyl-ring opening reaction occurs to 29-Norlanosterol.

Note

References

Sterols